Tan Sri Mohamed Khir bin Johari (29 January 1923 – 19 November 2006) was a Malaysian politician and the former Malaysian Minister of Education.

Born on 29 January 1923, in Alor Setar, Khir received formal education in the prestigious Sultan Abdul Hamid College (KSAH) in Kedah. Khir was a Member of Parliament from 1955 to 1982. He was involved in the Malaysian political scene from its inception and served in the Cabinet of Tunku Abdul Rahman and Tun Abdul Razak.

Upon his retirement he held positions in several organisations, most famously as President of the World Wide Fund for Nature of Malaysia (WWF).

Khir died of heart failure at 83 on 19 November 2006. He was accorded a state funeral and was buried in Makam Pahlawan near Masjid Negara, Kuala Lumpur.

Early life and education

Mohamed Khir was born on 29 January 1923, in Alor Setar, Kedah. He received formal education in the Sultan Abdul Hamid College (KSAH) in Kedah. His desire to continue studying at Medical College, Raffles College in Singapore in 1940 was thwarted when the Second World War (PDII) broke out.

Early career

After the war, Khir Johari returned to his alma mater Sultan Abdul Hamid College as a teacher, where he taught English. During this time, he was politically active through his involvement with the Malay nationalist organisation SABERKAS (Sayang Akan Bangsa Ertinya Redha Korban Apa Segala).

After Tunku Abdul Rahman took over from Dato' Sir Onn Jaafar as president of UMNO, Khir was appointed as Secretary-General of UMNO and was tasked to oversee the first federal election in Malaya in 1955. After winning the constituency of Kedah Tengah, Khir was appointed into the Cabinet as Assistant Minister of Agriculture.

Government Service

Upon Independence, Khir was appointed into the first Cabinet of independent Malaya as the Minister of Education. He held on to this post until 1960, when he was transferred to the Ministry of Trade and Commerce.

In 1964, Khir was made Minister of Agriculture, replacing Abdul Aziz Ishak, who had been relieved of his position and later detained under the Internal Security Act.

In 1966, Khir returned to helm the Ministry of Education until 1969. Following the 13 May riots, Khir was appointed Minister of Trade and Industry as key Tunku allies were sidelined. This allowed the government to implement Malay nationalist policies in education, including the abolishment of English-medium education at primary, secondary and tertiary levels.

In February 1973, Khir was appointed the Malaysian Ambassador to the United States of America, and later concurrently the Permanent Representative to the United Nations. He served as a diplomat until 1976.

In 1978, Khir contested his last general election, and retired from active politics at the end of the term in 1982.

Civil Society

During and after his career in politics, Khir Johari was active in various civil society organisations, including as president of the Malaysian Institute of Directors, president of the World Wide Fund for Nature of Malaysia (WWF), president of the Malaysian Zoological Society, president of the Royal Commonwealth Society and president of the Royal Selangor Club among others.

Khir was also the Charter President of Kiwanis Club of Kuala Lumpur and was later awarded the title of 'Bapa Kiwanis'. He was also the founding chairman of the Malaysian Toray Science Foundation, as well as the Tunku Abdul Rahman Foundation.

Khir took an active interest in sports, serving as deputy president of the Olympic Council of Malaysia from 1982 to 2002. He was also famously the president of the Badminton Association of Malaysia from 1961 to 1985, during which the Malaysian team managed to win the prestigious Thomas Cup in 1967.

Khir was also the founding president of the Sepak Takraw Association of Malaysia, president of the Malaysian Body Building Federation and president of the Lawn Tennis Association of Malaysia.

Awards and honours

In appreciation of his services and contributions, Khir was awarded an honorary Doctorate in Law by the University of Malaya in 1968, an honorary Doctorate in Education and Science by the De La Salle College, Manila in 1967, the Senatorship by the Junior Chamber International in 1967, the 'Langkawi Award' – the highest tribute for an individual Malaysian for outstanding contributions in the field of environment in 1995 and the 'WWF Member of Honour' award by the World President of the WWF for outstanding service to the environment in 1999.

He was also the recipient of the Tokoh Sukan Award in 1998, International Olympic Council Merit Award in 1998 for the development of sports, the President's Award by the Malaysia American Society in 1999, the PATA Roll of Honor in 2001, the OCM Hall of Fame in 2002, the Paul Harris Fellow by the Rotary Foundation of Rotary International, the Tablet of Honor by the Kiwanis International Foundation in 2003, the United Nations Malaysia Award in 2004, and the first recipient of the Golden Years Award by the AUTORR Foundation in 2005.

He was bestowed the award of the Panglima Mangku Negara (P.M.N.) which carries the title of Tan Sri, the Seri Paduka Seri Setia Sultan Abdul Halim Muadzam Shah (D.H.M.S.) which carries the title of Dato' Paduka and the Dato' Paduka Mahkota Selangor (D.P.M.S.) in 1992.

Honours

Honours of Malaysia
  :
  Recipient of the Malaysian Commemorative Medal (Gold) (PPM) (1965)
  Commander of the Order of the Defender of the Realm (PMN) – Tan Sri (1986)
  :
  Knight Commander of the Order of the Crown of Selangor (DPMS) – Dato' (1992)
  :
  Knight Commander of the Order of Loyalty to Sultan Abdul Halim Mu'adzam Shah (DHMS) – Dato' Paduka (1997)

Places named after him
 Sekolah Kebangsaan Khir Johari, national primary schools in Sungai Petani, Kedah and in Perai, Penang
 Sekolah Menengah Kebangsaan Khir Johari, a national secondary school in Sungai Petani, Kedah

References

External links
 Obituary
 Man of the hour The Star, 15 August 2007.

1923 births
2006 deaths
People from Kedah
Malaysian people of Malay descent
Malaysian Muslims
United Malays National Organisation politicians
Government ministers of Malaysia
Members of the Dewan Rakyat
Ambassadors of Malaysia to the United States
Malaysian expatriates in the United States
Commanders of the Order of the Defender of the Realm
Agriculture ministers of Malaysia
Education ministers of Malaysia
Knights Commander of the Order of the Crown of Selangor